Sengrui (僧睿; 371–438 AD) was a Buddhist monk and scholar. He was born in what is now Henan. He became a monk at age 18, traveling extensively from age 24, meeting among others Dao An.

He ended up in Changan, where he took part in Kumarajiva's translation project. Sengrui wrote the introduction to Kumarajiva's translation of the Lotus Sutra. In fact, he is generally seen as one of four Kumarajiva's principal disciples.

References 

Later Qin Buddhists
371 births
438 deaths